The Illinois Central Passenger Depot is a historic railroad station located at the Big Sioux River at 8th St in Sioux Falls, South Dakota. The Illinois Central was the fourth railroad to reach Sioux Falls on December 19, 1887. The station was designed by L.A. Hill and opened in 1888. The stone building has a Queen Anne design utilizing local Sioux quartzite with a light purple color as the principal building material. The tower room contained the ticket office while the rear projection contained the wash rooms. On either side of the ticket office were the passenger waiting rooms and beyond them, separated by solid masonry walls were the baggage rooms. The depot represents an unusual example of the Queen Anne style in railroad architecture.

The station was added to the National Register of Historic Places on August 18, 1983.

References

Railway stations on the National Register of Historic Places in South Dakota
Queen Anne architecture in South Dakota
Railway stations in the United States opened in 1888
National Register of Historic Places in Sioux Falls, South Dakota
1888 establishments in Dakota Territory
Sioux Falls
Former railway stations in South Dakota